Christian Maicon Hening (born 25 August 1978 in Blumenau, Brazil), better known under the nickname Chris, is a Brazilian former professional footballer who played as a centre-back or defensive midfielder, notably for Eintracht Frankfurt from 2003 to 2011. He was named club captain of Eintracht Frankfurt prior to the 2010–11 season.

References

External links
 
 
 Chris at eintracht-archiv.de 

1978 births
Living people
Brazilian footballers
Association football midfielders
Brazilian people of German descent
Eintracht Frankfurt players
Sport Club Internacional players
FC St. Pauli players
VfL Wolfsburg players
TSG 1899 Hoffenheim players
Expatriate footballers in Germany
Brazilian expatriate footballers
Bundesliga players
2. Bundesliga players
People from Blumenau
Esporte Clube Democrata players
Botafogo Futebol Clube (SP) players
Coritiba Foot Ball Club players
Eintracht Frankfurt II players
TSG 1899 Hoffenheim II players
Sportspeople from Santa Catarina (state)